Chalchiuhtecolotl was a night owl god from Aztec mythology. His name means "precious owl."

References

Aztec gods